Mohammad Rona (born 10 January 1985) is an Afghan-born Danish politician and Member of the Folketing for North Jutland from the Moderates. Alongside sixteen other members of The Moderates, Rona was elected to the Folketing in November 2022.

References

See also 

 List of members of the Folketing, 2022–present

Living people
1985 births
Place of birth missing (living people)
Moderates (Denmark) politicians
[[Category:21st-century Danish politicians]
Members of the Folketing 2022–2026
People from Kabul
Afghan emigrants to Denmark
Danish people of Afghan descent